Indonesia participated in the 2007 Southeast Asian Games in the city of Nakhon Ratchasima, Thailand from 6 December 2007 to 15 December 2007.

Medal table

References

2007
Southeast Asian Games
Nations at the 2007 Southeast Asian Games